We Should All Be Feminists is a book-length essay by the Nigerian author Chimamanda Ngozi Adichie. First published in 2014 by Fourth Estate, it talks about the definition of feminism for the 21st century.

The essay was adapted from Adichie's 2012 TEDx talk of the same name, first delivered at TEDx Euston in London, which has been viewed more than six million times.

Content
We Should All Be Feminists includes anecdotes and analyses about what it means to be a feminist. She argues that "feminist" isn't an insult, but rather a label that should be embraced by all. While feminism advocates for equity and equality between men and women in all aspects of life, the fiercest opponents of women's liberation believe that feminism is a social movement that focuses on reversing gender roles and making men inferior. 

Adichie's "We Should All Be Feminists" succinctly unearths the need to transform social beliefs and gender constructs that promote the disparity between men and women. In essence, we should all be feminists not only as a commitment to women's liberation but also as a way of encouraging men to engage in conversations with women on sexuality, appearance, roles, and success.
Being a feminist entails championing for the rights of women and trying to make the world a better place for women. Feminism does not entirely challenge the biological roles of each gender as it only intends to revolutionize sexism by creating equal chances and opportunities for women and men. Feminism views people as human beings and aims to tackle the social injustices that silence people's will and power to exceed social expectations. Therefore, becoming a feminist normalizes women's success and allows men to strive to achieve even more in life.

Participating in the contemporary feminism paves the way for a prosperous and all-inclusive future society. Empowering women is not equivalent to taking away opportunities from men. Teaching the community to accord equal respect to women creates a conducive environment for success. Therefore, encouraging people to become feminists tunes their minds away from cultural and social constructs that limit their understanding of gender on sexuality and roles and allows men and women to become who they want to be without restrictions.
The book is critical of the way masculinity is constructed, suggesting that society as a whole must change if we are to reach equality.

Adaptations 

Audio from Adichie's talk was included in Beyoncé's 2013 song "***Flawless". Adichie was credited with a featured role on the track. Adichie has largely remained silent about her feelings on Beyoncé's use of her speech, but in a 2016 interview in the Dutch newspaper De Volkskrant, while acknowledging that with the song Beyoncé had reached many people who otherwise might never have heard the word feminism, Adichie said: "Still, her type of feminism is not mine, as it is the kind that, at the same time, gives quite a lot of space to the necessity of men. I think men are lovely, but I don’t think that women should relate everything they do to men: did he hurt me, do I forgive him, did he put a ring on my finger? We women are so conditioned to relate everything to men. Put a group of women together and the conversation will eventually be about men. Put a group of men together and they will not talk about women at all, they will just talk about their own stuff. We women should spend about 20 percent of our time on men, because it’s fun, but otherwise we should also be talking about our own stuff."

Reception 
The book received overwhelmingly positive reviews. Rupert Hawksley said: "it just might be the most important book you read all year" in The Telegraph. The Independent selected it as a book of the year, for it "would be the book I'd press into the hands of girls and boys, as an inspiration for a future 'world of happier men and happier women who are truer to themselves'".

In December 2015, the Swedish Women's Lobby and publisher Albert Bonniers revealed the book is to be distributed to every 16-year-old high school student in Sweden, with the intention that it will "work as a stepping stone for a discussion about gender equality and feminism". The effort is supported by the UN Association of Sweden, the Swedish Trade Union Conferation, the Order of the Teaspoon, Unizon and Gertrud Åström. They "hope that teachers will integrate We Should All Be Feminists into their teaching, and will be distributing discussion guidelines to help".

In September 2016, designer Maria Grazia Chiuri, the first female creative director in the 70-year history of the fashion house Dior, at her premiere show for the brand featured a T-shirt bearing the statement: "We Should All Be Feminists".

The essay is excerpted in Margaret Busby's 2019 anthology New Daughters of Africa.

References

External links
 Chimamanda Ngozi Adichie, "We should all be feminists", TEDxEuston, April 2013.
 Chimamanda Ngozi Adichie, "Chimamanda Ngozi Adichie: 'I decided to call myself a Happy Feminist'", The Guardian, 17 October 2014.
 Alex Frank, "Chimamanda Ngozi Adichie on Her 'Flawless' Speech, Out Today as an eBook", Vogue, 29 July 2014.

2014 non-fiction books
Books by Chimamanda Ngozi Adichie
Feminist essays
Nigerian non-fiction books
Fourth Estate books